The War Illustrated was a British war magazine published in London by William Berry (later Viscount Camrose and owner of The Daily Telegraph). It was first released on 22 August 1914, eighteen days after the United Kingdom declared war on Germany, and regular issues continued throughout the First World War. The magazine was discontinued after the 8 February 1919 issue, but returned 16 September 1939 following the start of the Second World War. 255 issues were published over the course of the Second World War before the magazine permanently ceased production on 11 April 1947.

Background 
The magazine offers a pictorial record of both World War I and World War II and includes numerous maps, photographs and illustrations, and the work of war artists, weekly reporting, and editorials on the conduct, events, and consequences of global conflict.

Subtitled "A Pictorial Record of the Conflict of the Nations", The War Illustrated was at first sensationalistic and patriotic. Although it contained articles, the main focus was on photographs and illustrations, most notably those of Stanley Wood dramatising (or in some cases fabricating) events involving German troops. The magazine became more diligent in properly verifying its reports from 1916 onwards.

Both versions of The War Illustrated were edited by John Hammerton, who also contributed articles throughout the magazine's run. The magazine contained personal accounts of the war by war correspondents such as Hamilton Fyfe and Luigi Barzini, Sr., descriptions and illustrations of Victoria Cross actions (for example those of John Lynn and John George Smyth) and articles by authors such as H. G. Wells ("Why Britain Went To War", "Will The War Change England?") and Winston Churchill ("The Right View of Verdun"). It was extremely popular: at its peak at the end of World War I, The War Illustrated had a circulation of 750,000.

Digitized copies online 

 
               
      
      
      
      
      
      
      
      
      
      
     

 
  , ; .
 
 
 
 
<li> 
 
 
 
 
 

   (periodical),  (bound vols.); .
Weekly
   (Vol. 1).
                
      
      
      
      
      
      
      
      
      
      
      
      
      
      
      
      
      
      
      

   (Vol. 2).
                
      
      
      
      
      
      
      
      
      
      
      
      
      
      
      
      
      
      
      
      
      
      
      

   (Vol. 3).
                
      
      
      
      
      
      
      
      
      
      
      
      
      
      
      
      
      
      
      
      
      
      
      
      
      

   (Vol. 4).
              
      
      
      
      
      
      
      
      
      
      
      
      
      
      
      
      
      
      
      
      
      
      
      
      
      
      
      
      
      
      

   (Vol. 5).
              
      
      
      
      
     

                   
      
      
      
      
      
      
      
      
      
      
      
      
      
      
      
      
      
      
      

                   
      
      
      
      
      
      
      
      

   (Vol. 6).
               
      
      
      
      
      
      
      
      
      
      
      
      
      
      
      
      
      
      
      
      
      
      
      
      
      
     

   (Vol. 7).
               
      
      
      
      
      
      
      
      
      
      
      
      
      
      
      
      
      
      
      
      
      
      
      
      
      
     
   (Vol. 8).
               
      
      
      
      
      
      
      
      
      
      
      
      
      
      
      
      
      
      
      
      
      
      
      
      
      
     

   (Vol. 9).
               
      
      
      
      
      
      
      
      
      
      
      
      
      
      
      
      
      
      
      
      
      
      
      
      
      
     

   (Vol. 10).

Contributors 
 Stanley Llewellyn Wood (1866–1928), illustrator of many covers of the World War I editions. Most bound editions omitted the cover-pages.
 Paul Nash (1889–1946), artist and photographer
 Julien Bryan (1899–1974), American photographer
 H. G. Wells (1866–1946), English writer
 Sidney Low (1857–1932), British journalist and historian
 Jerome K. Jerome (1859–1927), English writer
 Fred T. Jane (1865–1916), English writer
 Philip Gibbs (1877–1962), English journalist
 Ellis Ashmead-Bartlett (1881–1931), English war correspondent during World War I
 Ernest Brooks (1876–1957), British photographer, known for his war photography from World War I

Illustrations

Bibliography

Annotations

Notes

References

 
 
 

 

 

 
<li> 
 
 

  In:

External links
A History of The War Illustrated (archived link (archived link)
The War Illustrated (articles from the Second World War editions)
The war illustrated album de luxe; the story of the great European war told by camera, pen and pencil. Volumes 1-10 at the Internet Archive  (London: The Amalgamated Press, 1915–1919)
Complete run of issues of The War Illustrated from World War II scanned from reprints

Defunct magazines published in the United Kingdom
Magazines established in 1914
Magazines disestablished in 1947
Military magazines published in the United Kingdom
World War I publications
World War II and the media